Thomas Ellis was the first settler in the area known today as Penticton. He was the biggest cattle baron in the South Okanagan area.

Background 

Thomas Ellis was born in Ireland but left for British Columbia when he was nineteen. In January 1865, Ellis sailed for British Columbia and arrived in Victoria in March 1865. It was in the late 1860s that Ellis began to accumulate large acreages in the South Okanagan. His original holding had 642.35 acres and was located on a large piece of land in modern-day Penticton.
Ellis returned to Ireland and married Wilhelmina Wade on February 10, 1873. Ellis and his wife would have nine children together. Wilhelmina would become well known for her nursing skills in the Okanagan.
After his marriage, Ellis returned to the Okanagan and by the 1890s he had 20,000 heads of cattle and 31,000 acres of land from the South Okanagan all the way to the American border. Mining companies provided a good market for his beef. Although Ellis claimed all of that land as his own, much of the land that his cattle roamed on was not actually owned by him, but he built up his empire based on grazing rights.

References 

People from Penticton
Persons of National Historic Significance (Canada)
Year of birth missing
Year of death missing
Canadian cattlemen